Konstanz station is the largest passenger station in the German city of Konstanz (Constance). It is served by regional and long-distance services operated by Deutsche Bahn and Swiss Federal Railways. It is the end of the High Rhine Railway and the beginning of the Lake Line.

History
The station was opened to traffic 15 June 1863 with the opening of the last section of the Upper Rhine Railway between Waldshut and Konstanz by the Grand Duchy of Baden State Railway. The link to Switzerland was opened in 1871, when the Swiss Northeastern Railway (NOB) opened the line between Romanshorn and Konstanz, now part of the Seelinie ("Lake line"). On 17 July 1875 this was followed by the building of the Etzwilen–Konstanz line, together with the Kreuzlingen–Kreuzlingen harbour connecting line, by the Swiss National Railway (Schweizerische Nationalbahn, SNB). After the SNB went bankrupt in 1878, its tracks were taken over by the NOB. In 1902, the NOB was absorbed in the newly created SBB.

In 1911, the Mittelthurgau-Bahn (MThB) opened a line from Kreuzlingen via Berg and Weinfelden to Wil. From the beginning, services from Kreuzlingen ran on the former SBB line through Konstanz to connect with the German rail network. It was served by the S-Bahn-like Seehas (named after a mythical "lake hare") service developed by the MThB over the Upper Rhine Railway to Engen. In 2002, the MThB fell into financial difficulties and was subsequently liquidated. Since then, subsidiaries of SBB have operated its services: SBB GmbH between Konstanz and Engen and THURBO between Konstanz and Weinfelden/Wil.

Architecture 
The station is located on the shore. The station building was built in 1863 in Gothic and Renaissance styles, modelled on the Palazzo Vecchio in Florence. North of the entrance building was the Fürstenbahnhof ("princes’ station building"), a pavilion, which now serves as a shopping centre.

The station has three tracks: a “home” platform (next to the entrance building) and a central island platform. To reach the central platform, tracks 2 and 1 must be crossed on the level. This crossing is protected by a barrier. At the northern end, there is also a tunnel that connects the platforms on one side to the city centre and on the other side to the port. In addition, there are two walkways and a shopping centre leading to the lake.

Structural condition 
In the past, Konstanz had a reputation as a "grubby" station, as it was rundown and inefficient. The last major work on the station had been the renovation of the bell tower carried out between 1975 and 1983. As part of the economic stimulus program the entrance building is being rehabilitated with energy-saving measures. The waiting area is also being made more attractive.

Border station
Konstanz has the function of a border station. Before November 2008, when Switzerland became a party to the Schengen Agreement, the central platform was separated by a chain-link fence. Long-distance trains to and from Switzerland stopped on platform 3. The station building also has two sections for the German and Swiss railways.  The German part is still operated by Deutsche Bahn and the Swiss part by Thurbo (formerly Mittelthurgaubahn). Until 2008 travellers to the Swiss section of the station had to pass through a form of passport control to get to the platforms. The station remains a customs border and as such customs checks are still possible by the authorities of both countries.

Traffic

Long-distance

Deutsche Bahn 

Deutsche Bahn operates only a few long-distance trains From Konstanz. A daily InterCity train running to/from Hamburg, extended in the summer months to/from Stralsund, was discontinued in December 2014. Since then, there is only one InterCity runs from Emden via Cologne: Friday and Saturday to Constance, Saturday and Sunday in the opposite direction.

SBB 
SBB InterRegio trains run hourly from Lucerne to Konstanz:

 Lucerne–Zug–Zürich Hauptbahnhof–Zürich Airport–Winterthur–Konstanz

Regional transport

Deutsche Bahn 
Konstanz is served hourly by Regional-Express trains on the Black Forest Railway. Until the timetable change in 2015, Interregio-Express and RE trains alternated from Kreuzlingen or Konstanz to Karlsruhe. This was changed with the timetable change, so that there is now a continuous RE hourly to Karlsruhe.

 Karlsruhe – Baden-Baden – Offenburg – Villingen – Donaueschingen – Singen – Konstanz (– Kreuzlingen).

SBB 
The SBB and its subsidiaries SBB GmbH, which has its head office in Konstanz, serves Konstanz with the Seehas regional service every half hour. Its subsidiary THURBO connects Konstanz and Kreuzlingen every half hour with the St. Gallen S-Bahn S14.

 : Konstanz – Radolfzell – Singen – Engen (Seehas) (SBB GmbH)
 : Konstanz – Kreuzlingen – Berg – Weinfelden
 : Konstanz – Kreuzlingen – Weinfelden
 : Kreuzlingen – Konstanz – Kreuzlingen Hafen – Romanshorn – St. Gallen (Thurbo)

The RegioExpress from Kreuzlingen via Konstanz to St. Gallen with stops in Kreuzlingen Hafen and Romanshorn was introduced in December 2015 after lengthy negotiations. At first there are five trains per day and direction. The project almost failed for lack of funding, although the Kreuzlingen/Konstanz-Romanshorn-St. Gallen railway line has been comprehensively refurbished in recent years for this express service. GTW sets from Stadler are used.

Other public transport 
The bus stop at the station is served by city bus lines 1, 2, 3, 6, 908, 9A/B, 12, 4/13, 13/4 and 14. The nearby Marktstätte bus stop is served by lines 5, 6 and 908 (towards Landschlacht). Regional bus services are operated by the express buses of the RAB to Ravensburg and Friedrichshafen. Some buses of the SBG operate to Allensbach and Radolfzell. Catamaran services also run every hour to Friedrichshafen from the port near the station.

References

External links

 
 

Railway stations in Baden-Württemberg
Buildings and structures in Konstanz (district)
Railway stations in Germany opened in 1863
Railway stations serving harbours and ports